A majority draw is an outcome in several full-contact combat sports, including boxing, mixed martial arts (MMA), and other sports involving striking. In a majority draw, two of the three judges agree that neither fighter won (i.e. tied scorecards), while the third judge indicates one fighter being the winner on his/her scorecard. Thus, the majority of judges see the outcome as even and the result is announced as such, although one judge gave a victory on his/her card to one fighter.

The outcome is one of the rarest judged decisions in professional boxing and MMA, apart from a unanimous draw (where all three judges score the fight as a tie), or a split draw (where one judge scores one fighter the winner, a second judge scores the other fighter the winner, and the third judge scores the fight a draw).

Notable examples

References

Boxing rules and regulations